Rockvale is an unincorporated community and census-designated place in Rutherford County, Tennessee.

The 2020 population of the CDP was 1,279.

Geography
The latitude of Rockvale is 35.757N. The longitude is -86.531W.

Snail Shell Cave in Rockvale is a large and biologically important cave owned and managed by the Southeastern Cave Conservancy.

Education
Rockvale is home to two schools, Rockvale Middle School for grades 6–8, and Rockvale Elementary school for grades PreK-5. In February 2017, the Rutherford County Commission approved construction of Rockvale High School. After 45 years since the high school studies were moved to Riverdale High School, construction will begin on a two-story structure behind the Rockvale Middle School at the cost of approximately $59 million. The new Rockvale High School is expected to be open for classes in August 2019.

References

Unincorporated communities in Rutherford County, Tennessee
Unincorporated communities in Tennessee